Aberyscir is a village in the  community of Yscir, Powys, Wales, which is  west of Brecon,  from Cardiff and  from London.

References

See also
List of localities in Wales by population

Villages in Powys